Nagoya 1988 was one of the two short-listed bids for the 1988 Summer Olympic Games, and was to be held in Nagoya, Japan.

Nagoya was eliminated in the first round of the ballot to select a host city at the 84th IOC sitting in September 1981 in Baden-Baden, West Germany.

Several years later, the city of Nagano was awarded to host the 1998 Winter Olympics. Nagoya is set to co-host the Asian Games with other towns and cities in Aichi in 2026.

Bid details

Proposed sport venues 
 Peace Park Olympic Stadium - opening and closing ceremonies, football, athletics, equestrian
 Nagoya Gymnasium - boxing
 Aichi Shinrin Park (Owariasahi) - archery, equestrian, modern pentathlon
 Magai Dam (Sobue), or Jinnoshinden (Toyohashi), or Miyoshi & Toyoda - rowing and canoeing
 Nagoya Cycling Race Track - cycling
 Chukyo Race Course (Toyoake) - equestrian, modern pentathlon
 Fujioka Area Park Land (Fujioka) - equestrian
 Fukiage Hall - fencing, modern pentathlon
 Mizuho Athletic Stadium - football
 Ichinomiya Stadium (Ichinomiya) - football
 Toyohashi Stadium (Toyohashi) - football
 Yokkaichi Field Track and Field Ground (Yokkaichi) - football
 Olympic Gymnasium - volleyball, gymnastics
 Nagoya Central Gymnasium - handball
 Suzuka Gymnasium, or Yokkaichi Gymnasium - handball
 Tsuruma Park - hockey
 Oshikiri Park - hockey
 Asamiya park (Kasugai) - hockey
 Gifu Stadium - hockey
 Nagoya International Exhibition Centre - judo
 Hino Shooting Range (Gifu) - shooting, modern pentathlon
 Chunchi International Shooting Range (Fujioka), or Okazaki International Shooting Range - shooting
 Olympic Park Pool - swimming, diving, modern pentathlon
 Mizuho Swimming Pool - water polo
 Aichi Prefectural Gymnasium - basketball
 Okazaki Gymnasium - volleyball
 Gifu Gymnasium - volleyball
 Nagoya Sports Centre - weightlifting
 Toyota Gymnasium - wrestling
 Tsu Yacht Harbour, or Gamagōri Yacht Harbour - yachting

References

1988 Summer Olympics bid
1988
1988 Summer Olympics bids